"The life of Riley" is an expression meaning an easy, carefree life.

Life of Riley may refer to:

Art and entertainment

Music

Albums
 Life of Riley: The Lightning Seeds Collection, a 2003 compilation album by British band The Lightning Seeds
 "The Life of Riley" (song), a single on the album, originally on the 1992 album Sense
 The Life of Riley (album), a 2011 album by Australian hip-hop artist Drapht
 The Life of Riley,  a 1991 album by American band The A-Bones
 Life of Riley, a 2001 album by American musician Riley Baugus
 Life of Riley, a 2008 solo album by Dave Brewer, former member of the Australian band Dynamic Hepnotics

Songs
 "Life of Riley", a song on the 1989 album Instrument Landing by American guitarist Preston Reed
 "Life of Riley", a song on the 1991 album Worlds in Collision by American band Pere Ubu
 "Life O'Riley", a song on the 1989 album S&M Airlines by American punk rock band NOFX
 "Life of Riley", a song on the 2011 album The Stellas by Canadian duo The Stellas

Bands
 Life of Riley, a band headed by American musician Riley Smith

Stage and film
 The Life of Riley (1927 film), a 1927 American silent film directed by William Beaudine
 The Life of Riley (1949 film), an American comedy film

 Save It for the Stage: The Life of Reilly, a 2004 one-man show by Charles Nelson Reilly
 The Life of Reilly, a 2006 film based on the stage show by Charles Nelson Reilly 
 Life of Riley (play), a 2010 play by Alan Ayckbourn
 Life of Riley (2014 film), a 2014 French film of Ayckbourn's play, directed by Alain Resnais
 B.B. King: The Life of Riley, a 2014 documentary directed by English Jon Brewer

Broadcasting
 The Life of Riley, an American 1940s radio show, 1949 film, both starring William Bendix, a 1949 TV series starring Jackie Gleason and 1950s TV series starring William Bendix
 Life of Riley (UK TV series), a 2009–2011 comedy series
 "Life of Riley", an episode of Birdz, an animated American-Canadian television series
 "Life of Riley", an episode of the American television series The Client List
 "The Life of Riley", a 1985 episode of the American television series The Fall Guy

Writing
 The Life of Riley, a 1937 novel by American writer Harvey Fergusson
  The Life of Riley, a 1964 novel by Irish writer Anthony Cronin
 The Life of Riley, a 1990 novel by Australian writer Jack Hibberd
 "Life of Reilly", a regular column in Sports Illustrated by Rick Reilly, 1997–2007

Other
 Life of Riley, horse who won the 1999 Australian Hall Mark Stakes

See also
 Riley (disambiguation)